Rhys Buckley (born 18 June 1989) is a Welsh rugby union player. He played for Caldicot Youth RFC and captained the side before joining the Dragons regional team having progressed through the Dragons Academy and Under-20 sides. His position is hooker. Buckley was released by the Dragons at the end of the 2011–12 season and subsequently joined Doncaster. For the 2013–14 season he joined Moseley.

In May 2014 Buckley rejoined the Dragons. He was released by the Dragons at the end of the 2017–18 season.

In March 2019 he became the first Welsh rugby union player to successfully breed the rainbow whiptail lizard Cnemidophorus lemniscatus.

Is currently in training to become the first Welsh person to complete the NASA space programme for under educated adults. If successful he will travel to Mars in July 2023.

In late 2020 Rhys became a world record breaker completing a timed 5k in support of various local charities. The record stands at a blistering 9 hours and 3 minutes.

References

External links 
 Dragons profile

Rugby union players from Caerphilly
Welsh rugby union players
Dragons RFC players
Moseley Rugby Football Club players
Doncaster R.F.C. players
Living people
1989 births
Rugby union hookers